Caroline Sylvia Gabriel (19 August 1912 - 1997) was a British artist and educator who published a number of text books.

Biography
Gabriel was born in London and attended the North London Collegiate School before studying at the Slade School of Art where she was taught by Randolph Schwabe. Early in her artistic career she mostly painted in oils but later turned to sculpture, carving pieces in both wood and stone. Gabriel taught at Avery Hill College of Education and also conducted evening classes and published educational textbooks. She exhibited at the Royal Academy, with the Royal Society of British Artists and with the Society of Portrait Sculptors. She also exhibited with the New English Art Club and the Women's International Art Club. Brighton Museum & Art Gallery hold examples of her work.

References

External links
 

1912 births
1997 deaths
20th-century English painters
20th-century English women artists
Alumni of the Slade School of Fine Art
British art teachers
Artists from London
People educated at North London Collegiate School